Finland competed at the 1984 Winter Paralympics held in Innsbruck, Austria. Thirty competitors (24 men and 6 women) from Finland won 34 medals, including 19 gold, 9 silver and 6 bronze medals. Finland finished 2nd in the medal table.

Alpine skiing 

Two athletes competed in alpine skiing:

 Kari Laakkonen competed in the Men's Downhill LW5/7 and Men's Giant Slalom LW5/7 events.
 Kari Tarvasaho competed in the Men's Downhill LW4 and Men's Giant Slalom LW4 events.

Cross-country skiing 

  Jouko Grip Men's Middle Distance 20 km LW6/8
  Jouko Grip, Veikko Jantunen, Kimmo Kettunen, Heikki Miettinen Men's 4x5 km Relay LW2-9
  Jouko Grip Men's Short Distance 10 km LW6/8
  Alli Hatva Women's Middle Distance 10 km LW6/8
  Alli Hatva Women's Short Distance 5 km LW6/8
  Veikko Jantunen Men's Short Distance 5 km LW4
  Samuli Kaemi Men's Middle Distance 10 km LW2
  Kyllikki Luhtapuro Women's Short Distance 5 km B2
  Liisa Maekelae Women's Short Distance 5 km LW4
  Kirsti Pennanen Women's Middle Distance 10 km B1
  Kirsti Pennanen Women's Short Distance 5 km B1
  Pertti Sankilampi Men's Short Distance 5 km LW2
  Samuli Kaemi Men's Short Distance 5 km LW2
  Samuli Kaemi, Lauri Moilanen, Pertti Sankilampi, Erkki Seppaenen Men's 4x5 km Relay LW2-9
  Ismo Alanko, Martti Juntunen, Mauno Sulisalo, Teuvo Talmia Men's 4x10 km Relay B1-2
  Martti Juntunen Men's Middle Distance 10 km B1
  Martti Juntunen Men's Short Distance 10 km B1
  Kimmo Kettunen Men's Short Distance 10 km LW6/8
  Kyllikki Luhtapuro Women's Middle Distance 10 km B2
  Liisa Maekelae Women's Middle Distance 10 km LW4
  Pertti Sankilampi Men's Middle Distance 10 km LW2
  Tarja Hovinen Women's Short Distance 5 km B2
  Veikko Jantunen Men's Middle Distance 10 km LW4
  Heikki Miettinen Men's Short Distance 10 km LW6/8
  Ari Mustonen Men's Short Distance 5 km LW2
  Tauno Seppaenen Men's Middle Distance 10 km LW2
  Mauno Sulisalo Men's Middle Distance 10 km B1

Ice sledge speed racing 

The medalists are:

  Lahja Haemaelaeinen Women's 100 m grade I
  Lahja Haemaelaeinen Women's 300 m grade I
  Lahja Haemaelaeinen Women's 500 m grade I
  Lahja Haemaelaeinen Women's 700 m grade I
  Veikko Puputti Men's 300 m grade I
  Veikko Puputti Men's 500 m grade I
  Veikko Puputti Men's 700 m grade I

See also 

 Finland at the Paralympics
 Finland at the 1984 Summer Paralympics

References 

1984
1984 in Finnish sport
Nations at the 1984 Winter Paralympics